Kimmswick is a city in Jefferson County, Missouri, United States. The population was 157 at the 2010 census.

Geography
It is next to the Mississippi River.

Nearby Imperial was once known as West Kimmswick. Today, Kimmswick is an enclave of Imperial.

History
Kimmswick was platted in 1859 by Theodore Kimm, who gave the town his last name. A post office called Kimmswick was established in 1858, and remains open.

The Kimmswick Historic District and Windsor Harbor Road Bridge are listed on the National Register of Historic Places.

Demographics

2010 census
As of the census of 2010, there were 157 people, 56 households, and 41 families living in the city. The racial makeup of the city was 90.4% White, 1.3% African American, 6.4% Asian, and 1.9% from two or more races. Hispanic or Latino of any race were 1.3% of the population.

There were 56 households, of which 39.3% had children under the age of 18 living with them, 57.1% were married couples living together, 16.1% had a female householder with no husband present, and 26.8% were non-families. 23.2% of all households were made up of individuals, and 7.1% had someone living alone who was 65 years of age or older. The average household size was 2.80 and the average family size was 3.34.

The median age in the city was 32.5 years. 26.8% of residents were under the age of 18; 9.5% were between the ages of 18 and 24; 26.1% were from 25 to 44; 28.6% were from 45 to 64; and 8.9% were 65 years of age or older. The gender makeup of the city was 45.9% male and 54.1% female.

2000 census
As of the census of 2000, there were 94 people, 35 households, and 24 families living in the city. The population density was 1,186.5 people per square mile (453.7/km2). The racial makeup of the city was 89.36% White, 1.06% African American, and 9.57% from two or more races.

There were 35 households, out of which 22.9% had children under the age of 18 living with them, 54.3% were married couples living together, 17.1% had a female householder with no husband present, and 28.6% were non-families. 25.7% of all households were made up of individuals, and 14.3% had someone living alone who was 65 years of age or older. The average household size was 2.69 and the average family size was 3.24.

In the city the population was spread out, with 21.3% under the age of 18, 10.6% from 18 to 24, 27.7% from 25 to 44, 17.0% from 45 to 64, and 23.4% who were 65 years of age or older. The median age was 40 years. For every 100 females there were 84.3 males. For every 100 females age 18 and over, there were 80.5 males.

The median income for a household in the city was $54,688, and the median income for a family was $66,250. Males had a median income of $44,250 versus $34,375 for females. The per capita income for the city was $23,359. There were 3.6% of families and 7.0% of the population living below the poverty line, including 8.3% of under eighteens and 21.4% of those over 64.

Education
Kimmswick is within the Windsor C-1 School District.

References

External links
City of Kimmswick
Kimmswick City Information
Every Kimmswick Shop, Restaurant and Festival Information
Kimmswick Shopping and Festival Information

Missouri populated places on the Mississippi River
Cities in Jefferson County, Missouri
Cities in Missouri